Lester Thomas Davis (September 6, 1904 – May 24, 1952) was an American politician.

Davis was born in Liberal, Missouri. He lived in Portola, California. Davis served in the California State Assembly from 1947 until his death in 1952 and was a Democrat. Davis died at his home in Portola, California from a heart attack. He wife Pauline Davis also served in the California State Assembly.

Notes

1904 births
1952 deaths
People from Barton County, Missouri
People from Plumas County, California
Democratic Party members of the California State Assembly
20th-century American politicians